Mahipal (1919–2005) was an Indian film actor.

Mahipal or Mahipala may also refer to:

Mahipala I (913–944), Gurjara-Pratihara emperor of the northern Indian subcontinent
Mahipala (c. 995–1043), Pala king of the eastern Indian subcontinent
Mahipala II (1070–1075), Pala emperor of the Bengal region of the Indian subcontinent
Mahipala (c. 1090–1105), king of the Kachchhapaghata dynasty in Gwalior.
Mahipala I (Chudasama dynasty) (1308–1331), Chudasama king of Saurashtra region of the western Indian subcontinent
Mahipala II (Chudasama dynasty) (1378–1383), Chudasama king of Saurashtra region of the western Indian subcontinent
Mahipala III (1430–1451), Chudasama king of Saurashtra region of the western Indian subcontinent
Mahipal Lomror (born 1999), Indian cricketer
Mahipal Maderna (born 1952), Indian politician
Mahipal S. Sachdev, Indian ophthalmologist